Pauri are stanzas of Punjabi poetry with two to ten or occasionally more lines, mostly used in Vars. They are similar to Shabads. Pauri couplets are commonly used in heroic Punjabi poetry.

References

External links
 The divine song of seasons - The Tribune, Chandigarh - 2 December 2006

Punjabi language